Thomas Fairfax Johnson (March 10, 1917 – March 21, 2007), nicknamed "Lil Professor", was a Negro league baseball player and American football coach. He served as the head football coach at Howard University from 1953 to 1956.

A native of Philadelphia, Pennsylvania, Johnson received his undergraduate degree from Springfield College in 1940, and played for the Philadelphia Stars that summer, posting a 3–4 record over 41.1 innings. After serving in the USO during World War II, Johnson became a coach at Howard in 1946, and received a graduate degree from New York University in 1947. He received his Ph.D. from the University of Maryland in 1967, and served as a professor of physiology at Howard from 1962 to 1978.

Johnson died in Silver Spring, Maryland in 2007 at age 90.

Head coaching record

References

External links
 and Seamheads
 Thomas Johnson at Negro Leagues Baseball Museum

1917 births
2007 deaths
Howard Bison baseball coaches
Howard Bison football coaches
Indianapolis Clowns players
Philadelphia Stars players
Pittsburgh Pirates scouts
College swimming coaches in the United States
Howard University faculty
Springfield College (Massachusetts) alumni
Sportspeople from Philadelphia
Players of American football from Philadelphia
African-American baseball coaches
African-American coaches of American football
African-American players of American football
20th-century African-American sportspeople
21st-century African-American sportspeople